Chen Shasha (born 14 December 1989) is a Chinese professional female windsurfer and sailor. She competed in the 49er FX event at the 2020 Summer Olympics.

References

External links
 
 

1989 births
Living people
Chinese female sailors (sport)
Olympic sailors of China
Sailors at the 2020 Summer Olympics – 49er FX
Place of birth missing (living people)
21st-century Chinese women